The 2012–13 MSV Duisburg season was the 113th season in the club's football history. In 2012–13 the club played in the 2. Fußball-Bundesliga, the second tier of German football. It was the clubs fifth consecutive season in this league, having played at this level since 2008–09, after it was relegated from the Fußball-Bundesliga in 2008.

The club also took part in the 2012–13 edition of the DFB-Pokal, the German Cup, where it reached the second round but lost to third division side Karlsruher SC next.

Review and events

On August 25, coach Oliver Reck was sacked and Kosta Runjaić was announced as the new coach on September 3, 2012. The club was relegated after they were refused a license to play in the second division.

Matches

Legend

Friendly matches

2. Bundesliga

Results

League table

Results summary

Result round by round

DFB-Pokal

Squad and statistics

Squad, matches played and goals scored

|}

Disciplinary record

Current squad

Transfers

In

Out

Coaching staff

References

External links

 2012–13 MSV Duisburg season at Weltfussball.de 
 2012–13 MSV Duisburg season at kicker.de 
 2012–13 MSV Duisburg season at Fussballdaten.de 

German football clubs 2012–13 season
MSV Duisburg seasons